Milton "Milt" Jamin (December 7, 1939January 1, 2018) was an American voice and film actor. He was often known by the alias Milton James.

Early life 
Jamin was born on December 7, 1939 and grew up in Jackson Heights, New York. He attended Lafayette High School and Brooklyn College. Milt then went on to serve in the National Guard in 1958.

Personal life and death 
Milt lived in Los Angeles for 26 years before he returned to New York to be closer to his family.

He died due to complications of a stroke on January 1, 2018, at the age of 78.

Filmography

Video Games 
Afterlife (1996) - Jasper Wormsworth
Grim Fandango (1998) – Membrillo
Xenogears (1998) – Dr. Citan Uzuki
Star Wars: Rebellion (1998) – IMP-22
Spyro 2: Ripto's Rage (1999) – Moneybags, Various Voices
Lands of Lore 3 (1999) – CABAL
Command & Conquer: Tiberian Sun (1999) – CABAL
Diablo 2 (2000) – Baal
Diablo 2: Lord of Destruction (2001) – Baal
Warcraft III: Reign of Chaos (2002) – Archmage
Warcraft III: Frozen Throne (2003) – Archmage
Grand Theft Auto IV (2008) – United Paper Man, Roman's kidnapper
Grand Theft Auto V (2013) – United Paper Man
Cars 3: Driven to Win (2017) – Ramone, Smokey
Warcraft 3: Reforged (2020) – Archmage

Animation dubbing

Animated series 

 The Transformers (1986–1987) – Blast Off, Stylor, Grax, Aimless
 The Return of Dogtanian (1989) – Planchet, Baron de la Tour

Anime dubbing

Anime 

 Fist of the North Star (1984–1987) – Additional Voices
 Nadia: The Secret of Blue Water (1990–1991) – Neo-Atlantian Commander (Streamline Dub)
 Teknoman (1992–1993) – Additional Voices
 Magic Knight Rayearth (1994–1995) – Chang Ang
 Street Fighter II V (1995) – Zoltar, Additional Voices (Animaze Dub)
 Rurouni Kenshin (1996–1998) – Additional Voices (Media Blasters Dub)
 Outlaw Star (1998) – Professor Nguyen Khan
 Trigun (1998) – Leonof the Puppet-Master, Sheriff Stan (ep. 4)
 The Big O (1999–2003) – Norman Burg (eps. 1–13), Additional Voices
 Arc the Lad (2001) – Gogen
 Mobile Suit Gundam 0083: Stardust Memory (1991-1992) - Aiguille Delaz

OVAs and Specials 

 Megazone 23 – Part II (1986) – Cop 1, FX Bridge 1, Wizard (International Dub)

Anime films 

 Lupin the 3rd: The Castle of Cagliostro (1979) – Jodo (Animaze Dub)
 Golgo 13: The Professional (1983) – Albert
 Lensman (1984) – Zuilk (Streamline Dub)
 Robotech: The Movie (1986) – Dr. Peters, Fake Good Samaritan 1
 Yu Yu Hakusho: The Golden Seal (1993) – Tree Demon (Animaze Dub)
 Street Fighter II: The Animated Movie (1994) – Senoh
 Ghost in the Shell (1995) – Additional Voices

Live action

Film 
 To Be or Not To Be (1983) – Gestapo Soldier
 The Stranger (1987) – Brandt
 Dark Angel: The Ascent (1994) – Mayor Wharton
 Devil in the Flesh (1998) – Mr. Monsour

Television 

 Battlestar Galactica (1979) - Alliance Leader (Episode: "Experiment in Terra")
 Angie (1980) - Waiter (Episode: "Brad's Best Buddy")
 Mork & Mindy (1982) - The Waiter (Episode: "Gotta Run: Part 1")
 Falcon Crest (1983) - Waiter (Episode: Ultimatums)

References

External links 

 
 Milton James at the Anime News Network's encyclopedia

1939 births
2018 deaths
American male film actors
American male voice actors
American male video game actors
People from Jackson Heights, Queens